Sovereign (sail number K-12) was the unsuccessful challenger of the 1964 America's Cup for the Royal Thames Yacht Club.

Design
Designed by David Boyd and built by Alexander Robertson & Sons, Sovereign was built especially for the 1964 America's Cup challenge. This was the second post-war 12-metre yacht to be designed by David Boyd and built at Alexander Robertson & Sons, the first one being Sceptre.

Career
Sovereign was built for J. A. Boyden in 1963. Sovereign lost 4-0 to defender Constellation of the New York Yacht Club.

Legacy
Sovereign was the last yacht that represented United Kingdom in general and Royal Thames Yacht Club in particular. Many members at that time thought that for a club that was founded in 1775 and participated in America's Cup since 1870 withdraw from the tournament completely was an embarrassment. The boatyard that built a yacht was sold by the Robertson family, who ruled it since its foundation in 1876, one year after the race, essentially ending wooden boat-building there.

References 

Alexander Robertson & Sons, history of the yard.

External links

America's Cup challengers
Individual sailing vessels
1960s sailing yachts
1964 America's Cup